Lída Merlínová (3 February 1906–11 July 1988) was the pen name of Czech writer, Ludmila Pecháčková-Skokanová. She began her career as a singer and dancer in the opera theater. After her marriage, she began publishing around 1929. She wrote the first lesbian novel in Czech and many of her works were written as inspirational novels for youth. She also wrote biographies of well-known personalities. Her works were banned in the communist era, but in the 21st century, there has been scholarship on her writing and involvement in the interwar period in the movement to gain civil rights for LGBT people in Czechoslovakia.

Early life
Ludmila Skokanová was born on 3 February 1906 in Prague, Austria-Hungary. She graduated from the Prague Conservatory in 1925 and began her career at the National Theater as a soubrette. Hired to work in the operatic ensemble at the Municipal Theater in Olomouc, she met the composer, conductor, and pedagogue, . The couple married in an arrangement of convenience and after her marriage, Pecháčkova turned to literary work.

Career
In 1929, using the pseudonym Lída Merlínová, Pecháčkova published the first lesbian novel written in Czech, Vyhnanci lásky (Exiles of Love). The book sold out within a few months, prompting fan mail, and praise from other writers, like Jiří Karásek. Throughout the 1930s, she wrote inspirational youth novels, often focusing on adventures for independent modern girls. Some of her works, such as Marie a Marta ve finiši (Marie and Marta in the Finish, 1934) and Činská dívka (Chinese Girl, 1938) had lesbian undertones. She was the primary lesbian writer for the journal, Hlas sexuální menšiny (The Voice of the Sexual Minority), and when it changed to Nový hlas in 1932, she continued to write articles on topical LGBT issues, like cross-dressing and finding the strength to overcome the adversity that LGBT people faced. She expressed in her writing that behaviors of some of the community made it more difficult for the rest of the community to be accepted by the heterosexual majority and gain full equality in society and before the law. 

In addition to her children's works Merlínová published biographical novels, including a 1935 work, Zdenin světový rekord (Zdenin's World Record, 1935) about Zdeněk Koubek, who underwent female to male gender reassignment surgery after having won two medals at the 1934 Women's World Games. Like her children's works, the novels she wrote for adults focused on emotionally and professionally capable women, and did not shy away from controversial topics. From the early 1930s to 1940, she also taught dance in Olomouc, but in the latter year, she and her husband moved to Dvora Král. She continued to teach dance even after they moved to Prague in 1945 after the liberation of the city. All of her works were banned during the communist period of Czechoslovakia, which began in 1948. Pecháček died in 1949, and Merlínová began a relationship with her female partner that would last until her death.

Death and legacy
Merlínová died on 11 July 1988 in Prague, Czechoslovakia. Largely forgotten during communism, she was included in the lexicon of Czech literary figures issued in 2000 and in the 21st century has been studied by academics both in the Czech Republic, as well as Britain and the United States, to reassess her literary contributions, as well as her involvement in the movement for LGBT rights that occurred in the country in the interwar period.

Selected works

References

Citations

Bibliography

Further reading 
 

1906 births
1988 deaths
Writers from Prague
Lesbian dancers
Lesbian singers
Czech lesbian writers
Czech lesbian musicians
20th-century Czech women writers
Czechoslovak LGBT people
Czech female dancers
Czech LGBT singers
Czechoslovak women opera singers
Dancers from Prague
20th-century Czech LGBT people